Zdeňka Vávrová (born 1945)  is a Czech astronomer.

She co-discovered periodic comet 134P/Kowal-Vávrová. She had observed it as an asteroid, which received the provisional designation 1983 JG, without seeing any cometary coma. However, later images by Charles T. Kowal showed a coma. The Minor Planet Center credits her with the discovery of 115 numbered minor planets.

The Florian main-belt asteroid 3364 Zdenka, discovered by Antonín Mrkos in 1984, was named in her honor and for the 20 years she had been participating in Kleť Observatory's minor planet astrometry program. Naming citation was published on 26 February 1994.

List of discovered minor planets

See also

References

External links 
 Zdenka Vávrová - Czech and Slovak comet discoverers

1945 births
Czechoslovak astronomers
Discoverers of asteroids
Discoverers of comets

Living people
Women astronomers